is a Japanese footballer. Seki previously played for Roasso Kumamoto in the J2 League.

Club stats
Updated to 23 February 2018.

References

External links

Profile at Kagoshima United FC

1982 births
Living people
Komazawa University alumni
Association football people from Tokyo
Japanese footballers
J2 League players
J3 League players
Japan Football League players
Roasso Kumamoto players
Giravanz Kitakyushu players
Tokyo Verdy players
Kagoshima United FC players
Association football defenders
Japanese expatriate footballers